Kniven is a mountain in Lom Municipality in Innlandet county, Norway. The mountain lies in the Smørstabbtindene mountains and it is surrounded by several other notable mountains including Rundhøe to the east; Stetinden and Stehøi to the southeast; Sokse, Veslebjørn, Storebjørn to the south; Kalven to the southwest; and Store Smørstabbtinden to the north.

See also
List of mountains of Norway by height

References

Jotunheimen
Lom, Norway
Mountains of Innlandet